Lancelot was a knight of the mythical Round Table.

Lancelot or Launcelot may also refer to:

People

Given name 
 Lancelot Andrewes (1555–1626), English bishop and scholar
 Lancelot Addison (1632–1703), English clergyman and writer
 Lancelot Addison (Archdeacon of Dorset)
 Lancelot Baugh Allen (1774–1845), British educator
 Lancelot Barrington-Ward (1884–1953), British surgeon and rugby union player
 Lancelot Blackburne (1658–1743), Archbishop of York and alleged pirate
 Lancelot Blondeel (1498–1561), Flemish painter
 Lancelot Stephen Bosanquet (1903–1984), British mathematician
 Lancelot van Brederode (died 1573), Dutch military leader
 Lancelot Charles Lee Brenton (1807–1862), English Bible translator
 Lancelot "Capability" Brown (1716–1783), English landscape architect
 Lancelot Browne (–1605), English physician
 Lancelot Bulkeley (1568?–1650), Welsh archbishop
 Lancelot de Carle (1508–1568), French scholar, poet and diplomat
 Lancelot Carnegie (1861–1933), British politician and diplomat
 Lancelot Clark (1936–2018), English shoemaker
 Lancelot Curran (1899–1984), Northern Ireland High Court judge and parliamentarian
 Lancelot Cutforth (1899–1980), British Army officer
 Lancelot de Mole (1880–1950), Australian engineer and inventor
 Lancelot Dent (died 1853), British opium dealer in China
 Lancelot Dowbiggin (1685–1759), English arcitect
 Lancelot Driffield (1880–1917), English cricketer
 Lancelot Elphinstone (1879–1965), Attorney General of Ceylon
 Lancelot Errington (1657–1745), English Jacobite mariner
 Lancelot Fish (1861–1924), Archdeacon of Bath
 Lancelot Gittens (born 1974), Guyanese athlete
 Launcelot Goody (1908–1992), Australian Roman Catholic bishop
 Lancelot Graham (1880–1958), British Indian civil servant
 Lancelot Grove (1905–1943), British cricketer and army officer
 Lancelot Hansen (1885–1928), Australian rugby league footballer
 Lancelot Hare (1851–1922), British civil servant, Lieutenant-governor of Bengal
 Lancelot Gerald Hasluck (1861–1937), English surveyor and philanthropist
 Lancelot Hemus (1881–1923), New Zealand cricketer
 Launcelot Henderson (born 1951), British Lord Justice of Appeal
 Lancelot Hickes (1884–1965), British Army officer
 Lancelot Hogben (1895–1975), British zoologist and statistician
 Lancelot Holland (1887–1941), British admiral who fought and died in the Battle of the Denmark Strait
 Lancelot Holland (British Army officer) (1781–1859), British Army officer and diarist
 Lancelot Oduwa Imasuen (born 1971), Nigerian filmmaker
 Lancelot Joynson-Hicks, 3rd Viscount Brentford (1902–1983), British politician
 Launcelot Kiggell (born 1954), British Army officer
 Lancelot Lake (1609–1680), English lawyer, landowner and politician
 Lancelot Layne (died 1990), Trinidadian musician
 Lancelot Lowther, 6th Earl of Lonsdale (1867–1953), English peer
 Lancelot Oliphant (1881–1965), British diplomat
 Launcelot Percival (1869–1941), Anglican priest and sportsman
 Lancelot Perowne (1902–1982), British Army officer
 Lancelot Phelps (1784–1866), American politician
 Lancelot Phelps (priest) (1853–1936), British clergyman and educator
 Lancelot Ribeiro (1933–2010), British Indian artist
 Lancelot Richardson (1895–1917), Australian flying ace
 Lancelot Richdale (1900–1983), New Zealand teacher and ornithologist
 Lancelot Ridley (died 1576), English theologian
 Lancelot Robinson (1905–1935), English cricketer
 Lancelot Rolleston (1785–1862), British politician
 Lancelot Royle (1898–1978), British sprinter and businessman
 Lancelot de Saint-Maard (died 1278), marshal of France
 Lancelot Salkeld (1475–1560), English clergyman
 Lancelot Sanderson (1863–1944), British politician and judge
 Lancelot Shadwell (1779–1850), English barrister and politician
 Lancelot Cayley Shadwell (1882–1963), English writer, lyricist, and ceramicist
 Lancelot II Schetz (died 1664), 2nd Count of Grobbendonk, Netherlandish nobleman and military commander
 Lancelot Slee (–1878), English farmer and smuggler
 Lancelot Slocock (1886–1916), English rugby union player
 Lancelot Smith (–1956), Australian rugby union player
 Lancelot Speed (1860–1931), British illustrator
 Lancelot Spicer (1893–1979), British politician
 Lancelot Spurr (1897–1965), Australian politician
 Lancelot Stafford (1887–1940), British athlete
 Lancelot Stirling (1849–1932), Australian politician and grazier
 Lancelot Threlkeld (1788–1859), English missionary in Australia
 Lancelot II of Ursel (1499–1573), Mayor of Antwerp
 Lancelot Volders (1636–1723), Flemish painter
 Launcelot Ward (1875–1929), British Army officer
 Lancelot Ware (1915–2000), English barrister and biochemist
 Lancelot Law Whyte (1896–1972) was a Scottish philosopher, scientist and financier

Surname 
 André Lancelot (born 1900), French rower
 Claude Lancelot, (–1695), French monk and grammarian
 Jacques Lancelot (1920–2009), French clarinetist
 James Lancelot (born 1952), English organist and choir conductor
 Livia Lancelot (born 1988), French motocross racer

Fictional characters 
 Lancelot Gobbo, a character in The Merchant of Venice
 Launcelot Langstaff, the pseudonymous author of the satirical periodical Salmagundi
Lancelot Lakeknight, a character in the Battle Arena Toshinden fighting game series
 Lancelot, a hero in Mobile Legends: Bang Bang

Arts 
 Lancelot-Grail, a volume of medieval French works that are a major source of Arthurian legend
 Lancelot, the Knight of the Cart, a 12th-century poem by Chretien de Troyes
 Lancelot (novel), a 1978 novel by Walker Percy
 Lancelot du Lac (film), a 1974 film directed by Robert Bresson
 "Lancelot" (Merlin), an episode of the 2008 BBC TV series
 Lancelot (video game), a 1988 text adventure game

Places
 Lancelot, South Australia, a ghost town
 Lancelot Inlet, an arm of Malaspina Inlet in the Desolation Sound area of the Coast of British Columbia, Canada

Other uses 
 Lancelet, a group of primitive chordates
 Launcelot (horse), a racehorse
 2041 Lancelot, an asteroid
 Brasserie Lancelot, French brewery
 Lancelot Press, Canadian publishing company

See also
Sir Lancelot (disambiguation)